Villanova Tulo, Bidda Noa de Tulu in sardinian language, is a comune (municipality) in the Province of South Sardinia in the Italian region Sardinia, located about  north of Cagliari.

Villanova Tulo borders the following municipalities: Gadoni, Isili, Laconi, Nurri, Sadali, Seulo.

References

Cities and towns in Sardinia